Leonardo da Silva Simas (born 12 November 1998), known as Léo Simas, is a Brazilian footballer who currently plays for Athletico Paranaense.

References

External links 
 

1998 births
Living people
People from Catanduva
Brazilian footballers
Association football defenders
Grêmio Catanduvense de Futebol players
Club Athletico Paranaense players
Orlando City B players
USL League One players
Brazilian expatriate footballers
Brazilian expatriate sportspeople in the United States
Expatriate soccer players in the United States
Footballers from São Paulo (state)